Ngāhinapōuri is a rural community in the Waipa District and Waikato region of New Zealand's North Island. It is located on State Highway 39, between Whatawhata and Pirongia.

The rural area of Koromatua is located to the north, near the Hamilton suburb of Temple View.

The Ngāhinapōuri area and surrounding Ōhaupō, Te Rore and Harapēpē area were military outposts during the Waikato War. Military fortifications were built at the settlement and nearby Tuhikaramea and Te Rore in December 1863; Another fortification was built to the north-east, north of Ōhaupō, in April 1864.

The earliest European settlers in this area were Bohemian militiamen from the Puhoi settlement north of Auckland. As of 2015, many descendants of these militiamen still lived in the area.

The area was previously serviced by the nearby Ohaupo railway station on the North Island Main Trunk

A nine-hole golf course has been operating in the settlement since the 1940s.

Ngāhinapōuri Hall replaced a smaller hall in 1913. Beside it is the school and Stewart Reid Memorial Park.

Demographics 
The settlement is part of the larger Ngāhinapōuri statistical area.

Ngāhinapōuri settlement had a population of 195 at the 2018 New Zealand census, an increase of 33 people (20.4%) since the 2013 census, and an increase of 60 people (44.4%) since the 2006 census. There were 63 households, comprising 96 males and 96 females, giving a sex ratio of 1.0 males per female. The median age was 41.9 years (compared with 37.4 years nationally), with 48 people (24.6%) aged under 15 years, 24 (12.3%) aged 15 to 29, 96 (49.2%) aged 30 to 64, and 27 (13.8%) aged 65 or older.

Ethnicities were 90.8% European/Pākehā, 12.3% Māori, 1.5% Asian, and 6.2% other ethnicities. People may identify with more than one ethnicity.

Although some people chose not to answer the census's question about religious affiliation, 56.9% had no religion, and 38.5% were Christian.

Of those at least 15 years old, 36 (24.5%) people had a bachelor's or higher degree, and 27 (18.4%) people had no formal qualifications. The median income was $53,600, compared with $31,800 nationally. 54 people (36.7%) earned over $70,000 compared to 17.2% nationally. The employment status of those at least 15 was that 84 (57.1%) people were employed full-time, 27 (18.4%) were part-time, and 3 (2.0%) were unemployed.

Ngāhinapōuri statistical area
Prior to 2018 it covered , so the earlier comparative figures are in brackets. Areas to the south and north east have been transferred to other areas.

The statistical area had a population of 1,668 at the 2018 New Zealand census, an increase of 207 people (14.2%) since the 2013 census, and an increase of 342 people (25.8%) since the 2006 census. There were 570 households, comprising 846 males and 825 females, giving a sex ratio of 1.03 males per female. The median age was 40.3 years (compared with 37.4 years nationally), with 366 people (21.9%) aged under 15 years, 267 (16.0%) aged 15 to 29, 813 (48.7%) aged 30 to 64, and 225 (13.5%) aged 65 or older.

Ethnicities were 91.7% European/Pākehā, 11.0% Māori, 2.0% Pacific peoples, 3.6% Asian, and 2.2% other ethnicities. People may identify with more than one ethnicity.

The percentage of people born overseas was 14.0, compared with 27.1% nationally.

Although some people chose not to answer the census's question about religious affiliation, 53.2% had no religion, 37.8% were Christian, 0.2% had Māori religious beliefs, 0.9% were Hindu and 1.3% had other religions.

Of those at least 15 years old, 291 (22.4%) people had a bachelor's or higher degree, and 216 (16.6%) people had no formal qualifications. The median income was $42,400, compared with $31,800 nationally. 345 people (26.5%) earned over $70,000 compared to 17.2% nationally. The employment status of those at least 15 was that 729 (56.0%) people were employed full-time, 228 (17.5%) were part-time, and 33 (2.5%) were unemployed.

Education 

See also

References

External links 
 1865 map

Waipa District
Populated places in Waikato